Alicia Patterson (October 15, 1906 – July 2, 1963) was an American journalist, the founder and editor of Newsday. With Neysa McMein, she created the Deathless Deer comic strip in 1943.

Early life
Patterson was the middle daughter of Alice (née Higinbotham) and Joseph Medill Patterson, the founder of the New York Daily News, and a great-granddaughter of Joseph Medill, owner of the Chicago Tribune. Her mother's father was Harlow Higinbotham, partner of Marshall Field's Department Store in Chicago. Patterson's sisters were Elinor (1904–1984) and Josephine Medill Patterson Albright (1913–1996).

The family lived on a farm in Libertyville, Illinois in her earliest years, during a period when her father eschewed capitalism. He returned to the publishing world in 1910, as editor of the Chicago Tribune. He sent Patterson to Germany to live with a family and learn German when she was four years old. During her childhood, Patterson's father taught her daring sports, like high diving and jumping while horseback riding, to test her courage.

Patterson attended the Francis Parker School and University School for Girls in Chicago. She was then sent to finishing schools in Maryland and Lausanne, Switzerland, from which she was expelled for violating the rules. She attended the Foxcroft School in Virginia, where she finished second in her class, and was then sent to a school in Rome where she was expelled for behavior issues. At age 19 years, she had her coming-out party in Chicago, after having spent a year in Europe with her mother and sister.

Patterson's half-brother, James Joseph Patterson (1922–1992), was the son of Joseph Patterson and Mary King (1885–1975), who married in 1938, the same year Joseph and Alice's divorce was finalized.

Marriages
Patterson married James Simpson, Jr., the son of Marshall Field's chairman of the board, according to her father's bidding. The couple lived together only one year and were divorced in 1930. During that period, she learned how to fly a plane with her father and hunted game in Indochina. In 1931 she married Joseph W. Brooks and was divorced in 1939.

In 1939, she married her third husband, Harry Guggenheim, who had been a United States ambassador to Cuba. Guggenheim was on active duty for the military during World War II, during which time Patterson ran Newsday. When Guggenheim returned, he ran the administrative aspects of the business.

Career
She worked in the promotion department of her father's Daily News in 1927, before being assigned as a reporter. She socialized with other young reporters at speakeasies and misspelled the names of the parties involved in a high-profile divorce case, for which the newspaper was sued for libel. She returned to Chicago after she was fired, then married Harry Frank Guggenheim, who was Jewish.

Patterson also had a career in comics, creating the character Deathless Deer with Neysa McMein. It ran in the Boston Herald and the Chicago Tribune in 1943.

Harry Guggenheim used a portion of the Guggenheim family's fortune to help his wife purchase a newspaper in Hempstead and found Newsday in 1940. Guggenheim awarded 49% of the paper's stock to his wife, and retained 51% for himself. Newsday'''s use of investigative journalism, "lively style", and coverage of liberal and international politics led it to become a respected newspaper. In 1954, it won the Pulitzer Prize and became the country's largest suburban magazine. Patterson used the paper as a vehicle to create an identity for Long Island.

According to Marilyn Elizabeth Perry:
Despite her own political opinions Patterson balanced the news coverage at Newsday, giving equal treatment to both Republican and Democratic candidates. Under her able leadership Newsday grew to become the largest suburban and twelfth-largest evening newspaper in the country, with a circulation nearing 400,000 in the 1960s. Until her death from bleeding ulcers she remained an active publisher and editor. She had intended for her niece and nephew to inherit the paper one day, but after her death her husband took over operations. Patterson was headstrong and said to have an explosive temper, but her good sense, determination, and invaluable editing brought city publishing to the suburbs. Patterson never wanted to make money or gain political power from Newsday. She maintained that all she wanted was “a good newspaper.”

Death
Patterson died aged 56, of complications following stomach surgery for an ulcer, on July 2, 1963. Her ashes are interred at her hunting lodge in Kingsland, Georgia.

John Steinbeck, Patterson's friend since 1956, wrote a series of articles in the form of "Letters to Alicia" for Newsday following her death. In them he expressed his controversial views, such as his support for President Lyndon B. Johnson's handling of the Vietnam War and his perception of moral decline within the United States. The series was written at the request of Harry Guggenheim, who became the editor of the newspaper following Patterson's death, with Patterson's nephew, Joseph Albright, working as his assistant editor.

Legacy
Patterson was memorialized by Joan Miró's mural, Alicia, at the Guggenheim Museum, proposed by Harry F. Guggenheim, who was then president of the Solomon R. Guggenheim Foundation.

The Alicia Patterson Foundation, created in accordance with her will, presents an annual prize to mid-career journalists.

Notes

 References 

Further reading
 Arlen, Alice, and Michael J. Arlen. The Huntress: The Adventures, Escapades, and Triumphs of Alicia Patterson: Aviatrix, Sportswoman, Journalist, Publisher (Pantheon, 2016).
 McKinney, Megan. The Magnificent Medills: America's Royal Family of Journalism During a Century of Turbulent Splendor (Harper Collins, 2011).
Perry, Marilyn Elizabeth. "Patterson, Alicia" American National Biography'' (1999) online

1906 births
1963 deaths
American Episcopalians
American newspaper editors
American newspaper founders
Medill-Patterson family
Businesspeople from Chicago
Businesspeople from New York City
Female comics writers
 Francis W. Parker School (Chicago) alumni
American women company founders
American company founders
Women newspaper editors
20th-century American women writers
20th-century American non-fiction writers
Guggenheim family
American women non-fiction writers
Newsday people